The 2018 Antrim Senior Football Championship is the 117th official edition of Antrim GAA's premier club gaelic football tournament for senior clubs in County Antrim. 13 teams compete with the winners receiving the Padraig McNamee Cup and representing Antrim in the Ulster Senior Club Football Championship. The Antrim championship has a straight knock-out format.

Naomh Éanna and Gort na Móna returned to the S.F.C. this year after claiming the 2018 I.F.C. and I.F.L. titles respectively.

Erin's Own Cargin were the defending champions after they defeated Creggan Kickhams in the 2018 final. 

St Mary's Ahoghill and St Teresa's were relegated after finishing 11th and 12th respectively in the S.F.L. They were replaced in 2020 by St James' (I.F.C. Champions) and O'Donovan Rossa (I.F.L. Champions). 

On 12 October 2019, Erin's Own Cargin claimed their 9th S.F.C. and successfully defended their crown when defeating Lámh Dhearg 3-16 to 0-23 after extra time in the final replay at Corrigan Park.

Team Changes

Promoted from 2018 I.F.C. 

 Naomh Eanna  -  (I.F.C. Champions)
 Gort na Móna - (I.F.L. Champions)

Relegated to 2019 I.F.C.
 St Joseph's Glenavy - (12th in S.F.L.)

Preliminary round
 Aghagallon 2-11, 1-8 Naomh Éanna, Glenavy, 17/8/2019,

Round 1
7 of the 13 senior clubs play in this round. The 4 winners and the 4 teams who received byes compete in the quarter-finals. The 4 losing teams exit the championship.

 Lámh Dhearg 3-13, 1-6 Ahoghill, Corrigan Park, 24/8/2019,
 Aghagallon 2-15, 0-13 St Teresa's, Corrigan Park, 24/8/2019,
 Roger Casements Portglenone 1-10, 0-9 St Brigid's, Glenravel, 25/8/2019,
 O'Donovan Rossa 0-16, 0-9 Gort na Móna, Springfield Road, 25/9/2019,

Quarter-finals
The four 2018 S.F.C. Semi-Finalists received a bye to this years Quarter-Finals. 

 St Gall's 1-16, 1-9 Aghagallon, Creggan, 7/9/2019,
 Erin's Own Cargin 1-14, 0-12 O'Donovan Rossa, Creggan, 7/9/2019,
 Roger Casements Portglenone 0-12, 1-9 St John's, Ahoghill, 8/9/2019,
 Lámh Dhearg 1-13, 0-11 Creggan Kickhams, Glenavy, 8/9/2019,
 Roger Casements Portglenone 1-12, 2-6 St John's, Coláiste Feirste, 11/9/2019, (Replay),

Semi-finals

 After extra-time had ended in a deadlock, a shootout was required to decide  who would proceed to the final. With the score standing at 10-10 in sudden death and Lámh Dhearg forward and former county star Paddy Cunningham about to attempt to put his side back in front, Antrim chairman Ciaran McCavana ran onto the pitch and told him that that would be it for tonight. Another replay was called by the chairman after consenting both managers.

Final

Ulster Senior Club Football Championship

References

Antrim SFC
Antrim Senior Football Championship
Antrim Senior Football Championship